The Salón de Mayo (May Salon) was an art exhibition held in Havana, Cuba, in July 1967. It took its name from the Salon de Mai, an artists collective founded during the Nazi occupation of France. It was organized by Carlos Franqui with the assistance of such artists as Wifredo Lam, René Portocarrero, Alexander Calder, Joan Miró, Pablo Picasso.

The exhibition presented works by more than a hundred artists and represented rival schools of twentieth-century art: early modernists (Picasso, Miro, Magritte); the next generation (Lam, Calder, Jacques Hérold, Stanley Hayter); and postwar (Asger Jorn, Antonio Saura, Jorge Soto).

Lam wrote to Franqui in anticipation of the event of his hopes:

Some artists were invited to create works in Cuba in the weeks preceding the exhibition, with those works donated to the Cuban government to form the nucleus of the collection of a contemporary art museum. The museum was never constructed.

Collaborative engagement was a principle theme of the event. On 19 July 1967, more than eighty artists and writers contributed to a mural, Cuba colectiva, in front of the Cuba Pavilion in Havana, adding either images or text inside spiral bands that circled outward from a central image of "rhomboid heads" by Lam. A Paris newspaper described the event:

In Franqui's words the enterprise represented:

The Surrealists had dreamed of "a revolutionary imagination that could support social change" and this event, in the estimation of one art historian, "delivered the opportunity for Surrealist adherents to participate satisfactorily–if only briefly–in an act of solidarity with an actual revolutionary regime ... that accommodated both sensuality and revolutionary rectitude." The radical poet Alain Jouffroy wrote:

The Salón was a unique event under a regime that, in the words of a writer who was later imprisoned, "used every imaginable pretext to keep culture on a short leash". As a demonstration of vigorous self-expression, the Salón de Mayo has also been interpreted as a rejection of the Soviet Union's approach to artistic endeavor, an assertion on the part of Communist Cuba of its independence from the Soviet model. Within Cuba, the Salón de Mayo represented the high point of free artistic expression. Some in Cuba's cultural establishment resented the influence of foreigners and visiting intellectuals, and they took measures soon after it against writers identified as dissidents.

The Cuban government released a series of commemorative stamps that depicted 25 of the works included in the show.

References

Further reading
 Llilian Llanes, Salón de Mayo de París en La Habana, julio de 1967, Artecubano Ediciones, 2012

External links
Picture of participants
Postage stamp

1967 in art
1967 in Cuba
Visual arts exhibitions
Culture in Havana
Surrealism
Freedom of expression
Public art
International artist groups and collectives